The Eclipse Award for Outstanding Jockey is an American thoroughbred horse racing honor for jockeys first awarded in 1971. Part of the Eclipse Awards program, it is awarded annually.

In 1995, Russell Baze was honored with the Eclipse Special Award for being the first jockey ever to win 400 or more races in a year for four years in a row.

Records
Most wins:
 7 - Jerry Bailey (1995, 1996, 1997, 2000, 2001, 2002, 2003)
 5 - Laffit Pincay, Jr. (1971, 1973, 1974, 1979, 1985)
 4 - Pat Day (1984, 1986, 1987, 1991)
 4 - Javier Castellano (2013, 2014, 2015, 2016)
 4 - Irad Ortiz Jr. (2018, 2019, 2020, 2022)

Past winners:
 1971 : Laffit Pincay, Jr. 
 1972 : Braulio Baeza 
 1973 : Laffit Pincay, Jr. 
 1974 : Laffit Pincay, Jr. 
 1975 : Braulio Baeza 
 1976 : Sandy Hawley 
 1977 : Steve Cauthen 
 1978 : Darrel McHargue 
 1979 : Laffit Pincay, Jr. 
 1980 : Chris McCarron 
 1981 : Bill Shoemaker 
 1982 : Ángel Cordero, Jr. 
 1983 : Ángel Cordero, Jr. 
 1984 : Pat Day 
 1985 : Laffit Pincay, Jr. 
 1986 : Pat Day 
 1987 : Pat Day 
 1988 : José A. Santos 
 1989 : Kent Desormeaux 
 1990 : Craig Perret 
 1991 : Pat Day 
 1992 : Kent Desormeaux 
 1993 : Mike E. Smith 
 1994 : Mike E. Smith 
 1995 : Jerry Bailey 
 1996 : Jerry Bailey 
 1997 : Jerry Bailey 
 1998 : Gary Stevens 
 1999 : Jorge F. Chavez 

 2000 : Jerry Bailey 
 2001 : Jerry Bailey 
 2002 : Jerry Bailey 
 2003 : Jerry Bailey 
 2004 : John R. Velazquez 
 2005 : John R. Velazquez 
 2006 : Edgar Prado 
 2007 : Garrett Gomez 
 2008 : Garrett Gomez 
 2009 : Julien Leparoux 
 2010 : Ramon Dominguez 
 2011 : Ramon Dominguez 
 2012 : Ramon Dominguez 
 2013 : Javier Castellano 
 2014 : Javier Castellano 
 2015 : Javier Castellano 
 2016 : Javier Castellano 
 2017 : José Ortiz 
 2018 : Irad Ortiz Jr. 
 2019 : Irad Ortiz Jr. 
 2020 : Irad Ortiz Jr. 
 2021 : Joel Rosario 
 2022 : Irad Ortiz Jr.

See also
 Sovereign Award for Outstanding Jockey
 British flat racing Champion Jockey

References
 The Eclipse Awards at the Thoroughbred Racing Associations of America, Inc.
 The Bloodhorse.com Champion's history charts

 
Horse racing in the United States
Horse racing awards